James H. "Jim" Fallon (born October 18, 1947) is an American neuroscientist. He is professor of psychiatry and human behavior and emeritus professor of anatomy and neurobiology in the University of California, Irvine School of Medicine. His research interests include adult stem cells, chemical neuroanatomy and circuitry, higher brain functions, and brain imaging.

Fallon, who states that he has the neurological and genetic correlates of psychopathy, has categorized himself as a "pro-social psychopath". In October 2013 his book, The Psychopath Inside: A Neuroscientist's Personal Journey into the Dark Side of the Brain, was released by Current (acquired by Penguin).

Family
James Fallon was born to an Italian American family. He also has English and Irish ancestry through New York colonial settler Thomas Cornell, who was convicted of murdering his mother and hanged in 1667. Fallon mentions the many murders that have occurred in the Cornell family line he shares with Lizzie Borden and discusses his and his family's genetics in a National Public Radio broadcast.

Academics
Fallon received his biology and chemistry undergraduate training at Saint Michael's College in Vermont  and his psychology and psychophysics degree at Rensselaer Polytechnic Institute in New York. He carried out his Ph.D. training in neuroanatomy and neurophysiology at the University of Illinois College of Medicine, and his postdoctoral training in chemical neuroanatomy at UC San Diego. He is Professor of Anatomy and Neurobiology at UC Irvine, where he has served as Chairman of the University faculty and Chair and President of the School of Medicine faculty.

Fallon is a Sloan Scholar, Senior Fulbright Fellow, National Institutes of Health Career Awardee, and a recipient of a range of honorary degrees and awards. He sits on several corporate boards and national think tanks for science, biotechnology, the arts, and the US military.

Fallon is a Subject Matter Expert in the field of "cognition and war" to the Pentagon.

Fallon has made significant scientific contributions in several neuroscientific subjects, including discoveries of TGF alpha and epidermal growth factor. He was the first to show large-scale stimulation adult stem cells in the injured brain using growth factors. He has also made contributions in the fields of schizophrenia, Parkinson's disease, Alzheimer's disease, and the roles of hostility and gender in nicotine and cocaine addiction. He has been cited for his research in the basic biology of dopamine, norepinephrine, opioid peptides in the brain, connections of the cortex, limbic system, and basal ganglia in animals and humans. He has published in human brain imaging using positron emission tomography, magnetic resonance imaging, diffusion tensor imaging tractography techniques, and the new field of imaging genetics.

Other work
In addition to his neuroscience research, James Fallon has lectured and written on topics ranging from art and the brain, architecture and the brain, law and the brain, consciousness, creativity, the brain of the psychopathic murderer, and the Vietnam War. He wrote Virga Tears: The True Story of a Soldier's Sojourn Back to Vietnam, which was published by Dickens Press in 2001.

Fallon has appeared on numerous documentaries, radio, and TV shows. From 2007 to 2009, he appeared on the History Channel series on science and technology (Star Wars Tech, Spider-Man Tech), CNN, PBS, BBC, and ABC for his work on stem cells, growth factors, psychopathology, tissue engineering, smart prostheses, schizophrenia, and human and animal behavior and disease.

On November 18, 2009, Fallon appeared as himself on the CBS crime drama series Criminal Minds, which explores his theory of trans-generational violence in areas of the world that experience continuous bouts of terrorism, war, and violence.

Both Fallon and his family have undergone functional brain imaging and genetic analyses for potential violence-related brain and genetic patterns.

Fallon was featured in the BBC production Are You Good or Evil?, where he revealed his discovery that he, himself, has the neurological and genetic correlates of psychopathy. Fallon stated that even though he has displayed callous behaviour in his life, particularly when he was younger, he believes that his positive experiences in childhood negated any potential genetic vulnerabilities to violence and emotional issues.

Fallon is politically a libertarian, and religiously an agnostic.

References

External links
 James H. Fallon faculty page at UCI.edu
 
 
 Dr. James Fallon Makes Being a Psychopath Look Like Fun, interview by Roc Morin in Vice, October 5, 2014

1947 births
Living people
American neuroscientists
American agnostics
American libertarians
American people of English descent
American people of Italian descent
American people of the Vietnam War
Cornell family
Psychopathy writers
Rensselaer Polytechnic Institute alumni
Saint Michael's College alumni